Lake Thonotosassa is an  lake named after Thonotosassa, Florida. Residential development surrounds the lake. There are no roads that cross it, but the four roads that go around it are: Taylor Road/Fort King Highway (west), Thonotosassa Road (south), McIntosh Road (east), and Knights-Griffin Road (north). U.S. Route 301 is about a quarter-mile northeast of the lake. The lake is owned and maintained by the Tampa Port Authority.

References

External links

Thonotosassa
Thonotosassa